Gasan Israpilovich Gasanov (born 1 January 1987) is a former Russian professional football player.

Club career
He made his Russian Football National League debut for FC Anzhi Makhachkala on 2 November 2006 in a game against FC KAMAZ Naberezhnye Chelny. He also played for Anzhi in the FNL in 2007.

See also
Football in Russia

References

External links
 

1987 births
Living people
Russian footballers
Association football midfielders
FC Anzhi Makhachkala players
FC Dynamo Vologda players